The City of Norwich Half Marathon is an annual road running event held in Norwich, United Kingdom.

History 

Duke Street Running Club staged the first event in 1985. The race was originally based in the City of Norwich, but in 1992 it moved to the Royal Norfolk Showground, close to Easton, Norfolk. The event was run in November but after the 2015 edition was moved to April, resulting in the cancellation of the 2016 edition.

Past winners 
The event has been won four times by Adrian Mussett, and five times by Sarah Stradling.

References

External links
 Official website

Half marathons in the United Kingdom
Recurring sporting events established in 1985
1985 establishments in England